Robyn Is Here is the debut studio album by Swedish singer Robyn. It was released on 13 October 1995 by Ricochet Records, Ariola Records and BMG.  The album peaked at number eight on the Swedish chart and was certified double platinum by the Swedish Recording Industry Association (GLF). In the United States, the album was certified platinum by the Recording Industry Association of America (RIAA), and had sold more than 922,000 copies by June 2010, according to Nielsen SoundScan. Worldwide, the album has sold over 1.5 million copies.

The album is mainly written and produced by Swedish production team Ghost, with all songs co-written by Robyn. Denniz Pop and Max Martin produced two of the album's four singles, "Do You Know (What It Takes)" and "Show Me Love". Both peaked at number seven in the US, while the latter peaked at number eight in the UK.

On 1 June 2004 BMG released Robyn's Best. While titled like a greatest hits album, it is a repackaging of the US edition of Robyn Is Here.

Critical reception

Writing for Melody Maker in February 1998, Peter Robinson described Robyn Is Here as an "impressive album" and highlighted it as an alternative to other contemporaneous pop acts; "While the music loses its edge stretched over 13 tracks, and at the same time surrenders its subtlety when heard on a song-by-song basis, Robyn Is Here is nonetheless a slinky, funky album, and for all those disappointed by the weediness of Louise, disillusioned by the Spice Girls, or distracted by the hastily drafted in Kim Wilde lookalike factor of All Saints, Robyn's your gal." In his consumer guide for MSN Music, critic Robert Christgau gave the album a B+ rating, indicating "remarkable one way or another, yet also flirts with the humdrum or the half-assed". Christgau described it as "So front-loaded it could almost be a vinyl album with a hot side and a cool side", but commented that "a few spins in, you notice a hint of velvet in her timbre—more like suede, really—that suggests not sensuality but emotional depth".

Robyn's Best
In 2004 a decade long partnership between Robyn and BMG ended. After hearing "Who's That Girl", BMG reacted negatively, encouraging Robyn to start her own label, founding Konichiwa Records one year later. Robyn's Best was released on 1 June 2004. While its title implies a greatest hits album, it is a repackaging of the US edition of Robyn Is Here with a revised running order and three tracks removed.

K. Ross Hoffman of AllMusic gave the album two out of five stars and calls it "a shamelessly misleading and essentially worthless release that seems misguided even as a straight-up cash-grab attempt".

Track listing

Personnel

Musicians

 Robyn                                      – vocals ; background vocals 
 Jeanette Söderholm                     – background vocals 
 Johan Ekhé     – background vocal arrangement 
 Mogge Sseruwagi                        – additional background vocals 
 Joe Watts                                  – additional background vocals 
 Picks Sjöholm                              – guitars 
 Henrik Janson                          – guitars 
 Mattias Thorell                            – guitars 
 Christian "Falcon" Falk – keyboards 
 Niklas Medin                               – additional keyboards 
 Päl Svenre                                 – additional keyboards 
 Per "Rusk Träsk" Johansson                 – saxophone 
 Goran Kajfes                               – trumpet 
 Ronny Farsund                              – horns 
 S.N.Y.K.O.                                 – strings 
 Janson & Janson          – string arrangement

Technical

 Ulf Lindström  – production, arrangement, recording & mixing ; vocal production 
 Johan Ekhé     – production, arrangement, recording & mixing ; vocal production 
 Denniz Pop                             – production, arrangement, recording & mixing 
 Max Martin                             – production, arrangement, recording & mixing 
 Christian "Falcon" Falk – production, arrangement, recording & mixing 
 Anders "BAG" Bagge        – production, arrangement, recording & mixing ; vocal production 
 Ronny Lahti                                – mixing 
 Harry "Slick Harry" Sommerdahl             – recording & mixing ; co-production 
 Björn Engelmann                            – mastering
 Håkan Wollgård                             – engineering
 Anders Lundin                          – assistant engineering
 Peter Swartling                        – creative direction & executive production
 Alex Strehl                                – creative direction & art direction
 Marlene Waltman                            – hair & makeup
 Miles Cockfield                            – stylist
 Christian Coinbergh                        – photography

Charts

Weekly charts

Year-end charts

Certifications

Release history

References

1995 debut albums
Robyn albums
Ariola Records albums
Bertelsmann Music Group albums
RCA Records albums
Albums produced by Ghost (production team)
Albums produced by Max Martin
Albums recorded at Cheiron Studios
Albums recorded at Polar Studios